Nathan Tyson (born 4 May 1982) is an English professional footballer who plays as a forward for Grantham Town. He represented the England under-20 team in February 2003.

A pacey, left-footed forward, he began his career at Reading, where he made his first-team debut in April 2000. He had loan spells at Maidenhead United, Swansea City, Cheltenham Town, and Wycombe Wanderers, before he joined Wycombe Wanderers on a permanent transfer in March 2004. He averaged a goal every two games for Wycombe and was sold on to Nottingham Forest for a £675,000 fee in January 2006. He spent five and a half seasons with Forest, and helped the club to win promotion out of League One in 2007–08. He moved on to Derby County in June 2011, and was loaned out to Millwall in January 2013. He signed with Blackpool in September 2013, and was loaned out to Fleetwood Town and Notts County after failing to win a first team place at Blackpool. He joined Doncaster Rovers in July 2014, and spent two seasons with the club before moving to Kilmarnock in 2016 for a year.

Club career

Reading
Tyson began his career at Reading as part of the youth academy, and made his first team debut on 29 April 2000, coming on as an 80th-minute substitute for Darius Henderson in a 1–1 draw with Bury at Gigg Lane. In August 2001, he joined Swansea City of the Third Division on an initial one-month loan. On 29 September, he was sent off for a foul on goalkeeper Stuart Brock two minutes after coming on as a substitute in a 2–0 win over Kidderminster Harriers at Aggborough, though manager Colin Addison said that he intended to appeal the decision as Tyson was "only a fraction from taking the ball". Tyson scored his first goal in the Football League on 23 October, helping the "Swans" to a 2–0 win over Darlington at Vetch Field. He returned to the Third Division towards the end of the 2001–02 season, joining Cheltenham Town on loan in March 2002. Manager Steve Cotterill signed him to help the club push for the play-offs, and Tyson scored one goal from one start and seven substitute appearances in the league, but did not feature in the play-offs as the "Robins" went on to secure promotion with a 3–1 victory over Rushden & Diamonds in the play-off final.

Reading were promoted into the First Division in 2002, and Tyson managed to earn himself a place in the "Royals" first team in the 2002–03 season, scoring his first goal for the club in a 2–1 victory over Derby County on 28 December. Reading qualified for the play-offs at the end of the campaign, though Tyson was sent off in the play-off semi-final first leg defeat to Wolverhampton Wanderers after fouling Paul Butler and then using abusive language.

Wycombe Wanderers
In December 2003, Tyson joined Second Division side Wycombe Wanderers on a short-term loan, although had to return to Reading early the next month for treatment on a knee injury. After impressing manager Tony Adams, Tyson was signed for an undisclosed transfer fee in March 2004 and agreed a two-year contract. He finished as the club's top-scorer during the 2004–05 season with 22 goals in 42 league appearances, and also won the club's Player of the Year award. During the close season, Tyson was the subject of three bids from Sheffield Wednesday, all of which were turned down by Wycombe.

He began the 2005–06 season with 13 goals in 19 games, making him the top-scorer in the English leagues at the end of September. He was named as the League Two Player of the Month for August, having scored six times in six games. Sheffield Wednesday had a £700,000 bid accepted in October, but Tyson rejected the move. Tyson stated that he was "flattered" and said "I'm not worth that. How many houses can you buy for £750,000?" He was also linked with moves to Wolverhampton Wanderers and Hull City. His goal glut was quickly followed by a run of six games without a goal, which led manager John Gorman to claim that "his attitude has been fantastic and he'll bounce straight back".

Nottingham Forest
In November 2005, Tyson joined League One side Nottingham Forest on loan until January, at which point he signed a permanent deal with the club for a fee of £675,000. He ended the 2005–06 campaign with ten goals in 28 appearances. He was injured just minutes into Forest's opening game of the 2006–07 season against Bradford City on 5 August, which kept him out of action for three months. On 9 December, he scored an eight-minute first half hat-trick in a 4–1 win over Crewe Alexandra at Gresty Road. He ended the season with nine goals in 30 games. He scored 12 goals in 39 league and cup competitions in the 2007–08 season, helping Forest to secure runners-up spot in League One and thereby win promotion to the Championship.

In May 2008, he was the subject of a £750,000 bid from Bristol City, which was rejected. In January 2009, Tyson signed a new contract to keep him at the City Ground until the summer of 2011. On 22 January, he scored a volleyed goal to help Forest to beat Premier League side Manchester City 3–0 in the Third Round of the FA Cup. On 29 August 2009, Tyson waved a Nottingham Forest flag in front of the Derby fans after the final whistle of a 3–2 East Midlands derby victory. He was defended by manager Billy Davies but received a fine of £5,000 and a two-game suspended ban for the incident. He scored just four goals in 75 appearances in the 2009–10 and 2010–11 seasons, though was often only entering the game as a substitute. He left the club in May 2011 after rejecting the offer of a new contract.

Derby County
In June 2011, Tyson signed a three-year contract with Derby County. He made his "Rams" debut in a 2–1 win over former club Nottingham Forest on 17 September. However, he made only two brief appearances in the first half of the 2011–12 season after struggling with groin problems. He scored his first goal for the club in the opening game of the 2012–13 season against Scunthorpe United in the League Cup on 14 August, a match which Derby drew 5–5 and lost 7-6 on penalties. He scored his first league goal four days later, in a 2–2 draw with Sheffield Wednesday. After the match it was reported that fellow Championship side Huddersfield Town were interested in signing Tyson on loan. Tyson fell down the first team pecking order at Derby behind Conor Sammon, Chris Martin, Johnny Russell, and Mason Bennett.

On 16 January 2013, Tyson joined Millwall on loan until the end of the 2012–13 season. Manager Kenny Jackett said that "he has experience of the division [Championship], which at times we've lacked, and he brings pace to our front line". He made his "lions" debut as a half-time substitute in a 2–0 home defeat against Burnley on 19 January; during this game he picked up ligament damage, with an initial prognosis before a scan ruling him out for a month. He failed to score and only managed four appearances as he struggled with injuries during his time at The Den. He was transfer listed by Derby in May 2013. He stated that he was unhappy at finding this fact out through the media and said that manager Nigel Clough did not tell him that he was placed on the transfer list.

Blackpool
In September 2013, Tyson joined Championship club Blackpool on a free transfer, signing a one-year contract with an option of a second. On 21 November 2013, Nathan joined League Two side Fleetwood Town on loan until 1 January 2014. On 3 March 2014, he joined League One side Notts County on an initial one-month loan, which was later extended until the end of the season. He failed to score in either of his loan spells or for his parent club in a total of 25 appearances in the 2013–14 season.

Doncaster Rovers
In July 2014, Tyson signed a one-year contract with League One club Doncaster Rovers after impressing on a three-week trial. He triggered a one-year contract extension in April 2015, and said he "rediscovered his love for football" playing under Paul Dickov. He scored a hat-trick on the last day of the 2014–15 season, in a 5–2 win over Scunthorpe United at the Keepmoat Stadium on 3 May. This took him to a final tally of 14 goals in 44 games in all competitions to finish the season as the club's top-scorer, and he was also voted the club's Player of the Year. He then scored seven goals in 36 games in the 2015–16 season as Rovers were relegated into League Two. He lost his first team place to new-signing Gary McSheffrey in March 2016, and manager Darren Ferguson agreed to activate a release in Tyson's contract in June 2016 despite the striker only signing a new one-year contract three months earlier.

He joined Port Vale on trial in July 2016, and manager Bruno Ribeiro told the media that he would sign the player if the club's finances allowed it.

Kilmarnock
Tyson signed for Kilmarnock on 12 September 2016, having agreed a contract to the end of the 2016–17 season. Kilmarnock announced in their match programme on 5 April 2017 that Tyson had been released from his contract.

Wycombe Wanderers (second spell)
On 3 July 2017, Wycombe Wanderers announced that Tyson had returned to the club on trial. After playing in some of Wycombe's pre-season friendlies, it was announced on 25 July 2017 that Tyson had signed a one-year deal to return to Wycombe. On 23 April 2018, Tyson signed a one-year extension keeping him at Wycombe Wanderers until the summer of 2019.

Chesterfield
He was released by Wycombe at the end of the 2018–19 season. Then went on to sign on for Chesterfield following the 2020-21 season.

On 22 January 2022, Tyson signed for Alfreton Town on a one-month loan from Chesterfield. Tyson was released by Chesterfield at the end of the 2021–22 season.

Grantham Town
In July 2022, he dropped down to newly-relegated Northern Premier League Division One East side Grantham Town following his release from Chesterfield.

International career
On 6 February 2003, Tyson scored both goals for England under-20's in a 2–1 win over Germany.

Style of play
Speaking in 2002, Cheltenham Town manager Steve Cotterill stated that "he is very quick and his main asset is his pace". Writing for The Guardian in October 2005, David Pleat said that "as a speedy, left-footed goalscorer Tyson is a rarity in the modern game" who made "well-timed runs", particularly for through balls, and had determination to chase lost causes.

Personal life
Tyson was a cousin to Mark Philo, who also played professional football for Wycombe Wanderers. In a 2005 interview, Tyson stated that he had a superstition that led to him dressing on his left side first, liked the music of Usher, and had an interest in cars.

Career statistics

Honours

Club
Nottingham Forest
Football League One runner-up: 2007–08

Individual
Football League Two Player of the Month: August 2005
Doncaster Rovers Player of the Year: 2014–15

References

1982 births
Living people
Sportspeople from Reading, Berkshire
Black British sportsmen
English footballers
England youth international footballers
Association football forwards
Association football wingers
Reading F.C. players
Maidenhead United F.C. players
Swansea City A.F.C. players
Cheltenham Town F.C. players
Wycombe Wanderers F.C. players
Nottingham Forest F.C. players
Derby County F.C. players
Millwall F.C. players
Blackpool F.C. players
Fleetwood Town F.C. players
Notts County F.C. players
Doncaster Rovers F.C. players
Kilmarnock F.C. players
Chesterfield F.C. players
Alfreton Town F.C. players
Grantham Town F.C. players
English Football League players
National League (English football) players
Isthmian League players
Scottish Professional Football League players
Footballers from Berkshire